Terminus Saint-Eustache is a bus terminus served by Réseau de transport métropolitain (RTM).

Bus and taxi routes

References

External links
 Terminus Saint-Eustache

Exo bus stations
Saint-Eustache, Quebec
Transport in Laurentides
Buildings and structures in Laurentides